Alessandro Alfonso Fortunato Gaudino (born 23 January 1970 in Salerno, Campania), better known by his stage name Alex Gaudino, is an Italian DJ and record producer.

Biography

Early career (1993–2006)
Alessandro Alfonso Fortunato Gaudino was born in Salerno, Italy. He first began his music career working for Flying Records and UMM.

In 1998, with the support of the well-known Italian record company Time, Alex founded his own label, Rise Records, which quickly produced a string of hit records by artists such as The Tamperer, Black Legend and Robbie Rivera's "Bang", which earned him a nomination for Best European A&R at the 2000 European Music Awards, held in London.

Alex Gaudino is also well known for being a member of the trio Lil' Love with Jerma and Sharon May Linn.

In 2005, Lil' Love's track "Little Love" was exclusively played by Pete Tong at Nikki Beach in Miami during WMC 2005. The record produced by Jerma was released on Positiva in the UK and reached the top of the UK Dance Chart. In 2006, Alex remixed with Jerma for Pete Tong & Chris Cox, Moussu T and James Kakande. Later in 2006, Gaudino signed a record deal with Ministry of Sound label in the UK. He later released "Reaction", and "Head over Heels" on the label.

Chart success, My Destination and Doctor Love (2006–present)
In December 2006, Gaudino released his second single "Destination Calabria" featuring vocals from Crystal Waters 2004 track "Destination Unknown" and elements of the saxophone. The song was hugely popular across Europe reaching top ten in nine countries and top twenty in many others. It also managed to peak eight on the U.S Hot Dance Club Songs. Later on, in 2008 he released his third single "Watch Out" Featuring vocals from English singer, Shèna. It achieved moderate success across Europe and peaked sixteen on the UK Singles Chart.

On 6 October 2008, he released his debut studio album, My Destination. As well as working with Crystal Waters and Shena on the album, Gaudino also worked with Hardwell.

In late 2009, he began work on his second album, which is pre-titled "Magnificent". In October 2010, he released his first single from his second studio album, "I'm in Love (I Wanna Do It)" featuring vocals from Maxine Ashley. It peaked ten on the UK Singles Chart and the Dutch Top 40. It also marked Gaudino's first number one in the U.S, peaking number one on the U.S Hot Dance Airplay Chart. The album later was changed to Doctor Love.

The following year, 2011, he released his second single from his second album, "What a Feeling", featuring American R&B singer, Kelly Rowland. It peaked six on the UK Singles Chart and top forty in many European countries. It also peaked 26 on the US Hot Dance Club Songs. The second album, Doctor Love, was released in 2013.

Discography

Studio albums

Singles

As lead artist

Promotional singles

Remixes
 2020: Alex Gaudino and Bottai featuring Moncrieff & Blush — "Remember Me" (Alex Gaudino and Hiisak Remix)
 2020: D3fai and Nathassia — "Change the World" (Alex Gaudino and Teo Mandrelli Remix)

References

External links

Alex Gaudino 2008 interview on ilikemusic

Living people
Italian DJs
Italian dance musicians
Italian house musicians
Remixers
1970 births
Electronic dance music DJs